Amod Mehra is an Indian trade analyst and film journalist. His work and commentary on Bollywood movies has been featured in such Indian news outlets and newspapers as The Times of India, Hindustan Times, NDTV, MiD DAY, and Zee News. Some major foreign media outlets, such as BBC News and The New York Times, have also quoted Mehra.

References

External links
 

Living people
Indian film critics
Year of birth missing (living people)